Kepler-20c is an exoplanet orbiting Kepler-20. It has a mass similar to Neptune but is slightly smaller. Despite being the third-closest planet to Kepler-20, it is still close to the star, meaning that it is a hot Neptune. Along with the other four planets in the system, Kepler-20c was announced on 20 December 2011.

References

Exoplanets discovered in 2011
C
20c
Hot Neptunes
Transiting exoplanets